Ferdinand Gregorovius (19 January 1821, Neidenburg, East Prussia, Kingdom of Prussia – 1 May 1891, Munich, Kingdom of Bavaria) was a German historian who specialized in the medieval history of Rome.

Biography
Gregorovius was the son of Neidenburg district justice council Ferdinand Timotheus Gregorovius and his wife Wilhelmine Charlotte Dorothea Kausch. An earlier ancestor named Grzegorzewski had come to Prussia from Poland. Members of the Gregorovius family lived in Prussia for over 300 years, and produced many jurists, preachers and artists. One famous ancestor of Ferdinand's was Johann Adam Gregorovius, born 1681 in Johannisburg, district of Gumbinnen.

Ferdinand Gregorovius was born at Neidenburg, East Prussia (now Nidzica, Poland), and studied theology and philosophy at the University of Königsberg. In 1838, he joined the student association, the Corps Masovia. After teaching for many years, Gregorovius took up residence in Italy in 1852, where he remained for over twenty years. In 1876, he was made an honorary citizen of Rome, the first German to be awarded this honor. A street and a square are named after him. He eventually returned to Germany, where he died in Munich.

He is best known for Wanderjahre in Italien, his account of the travels on foot that he took through Italy in the 1850s, and the monumental Die Geschichte der Stadt Rom im Mittelalter (History of Rome in the Middle Ages), a classic for Medieval and early Renaissance history. He also wrote biographies of Pope Alexander VI and Lucrezia Borgia, as well as works on Byzantine history and medieval Athens, and translated Italian authors into German, among them Giovanni Melis. According to Jesuit Father John Hardon, S.J. Gregorovius was "a bitter enemy of the popes."

Works
 Der Ghetto und die Juden in Rom, Mit Einem Geleitwort von Leo Baeck, Im Schocken Verlag/Berlin, 1935 (originally published, 1853)
 Der Tod des Tiberius ("Tiberius' Death", 1851)
 Geschichte des römischen Kaisers Hadrian und seiner Zeit ("History of the Roman Emperor Hadrian and His Times", 1851)
 The Emperor Hadrian (1898 translation by Mary E. Robinson)
 Siciliana (1853)
 Corsica (1854); Corsica (1855 trans. by Edward Joy Morris)
 Göthe’s Wilhelm Meister in seinen socialistischen Elementen entwickelt. Schwäbisch Hall: E. Fischhaber, 1855.
 Geschichte der Stadt Rom im Mittelalter (1859–1872) Translated into English 'The History of Rome in the Middle Ages' (1894–1902). (reissued by Italica Press, 2000–2004.); (reissued by Cambridge University Press, 2010. )
 Anne Hamilton's trans. of the 4th German edition
 Wanderjahre in Italien (1856–1877)
 Die Insel Capri (1868); The island of Capri (1879 trans. by Lilian Clarke)
 Geschichte der Stadt Athen im Mittelalter. Von der Zeit Justinians bis zur türkischen Eroberung ("History of Athens in the Middle Ages. From Justinian to the Turkish Conquest", 1889)
 Lucretia Borgia und ihre Zeit (Lucrezia Borgia: a chapter from the morals of the Italian Renaissance, 1874)
 John Leslie Garner's trans. of the 3rd German edition
 Die Grabmäler der Römischen Päpste (The Tombs of The Roman Popes), first edition 1857 in German (Google books link), later in 1881 as Die Grabdenkmäler der Päpste (The Tombs of The Popes) (Open Library link)  and in English as The Tombs of the Popes (tr: Louisa W. Terry) Victoria Press, Rome 1904 (Google books link)
 Die Insel Capri. Idylle vom Mittelmeer (1897)
 M. Douglass Fairbairn's trans.

Notes

External links
 
 
 
 
 Ferdinand Gregorovius
 Latian Summers (1903 English translation of part of Wanderjahre in Italien)

1821 births
1891 deaths
People from Nidzica
People from East Prussia
20th-century German historians
Historians of the Catholic Church
German Protestants
German male non-fiction writers
19th-century German male writers